Wanting is the desire for something that is lacking.

Wanting may also refer to:

Desire, the emotion of longing or hoping for a person, object, or outcome

Arts and entertainment
 The Wanting (Glenn Jones album), 2011 album by Glenn Jones
 The Wanting (Cody Jinks album), 2019
 Wanting (novel), by Richard Flanagan, 2008

People
 Mira Wanting (1978–2012), Danish actress
 Ling Wan Ting (born 1980), Hong Kong badminton player
 Wan-Ting Su (born 1982), Taiwanese artist
 Wanting Qu (born 1983), or Wanting, Chinese-Canadian singer-songwriter
 Liu Wanting (born 1989), Chinese tennis player
 Chen Wan-ting (born 1990), Taiwanese volleyball player
 Lin Wan-ting (born 1996), Taiwanese taekwondo practitioner

Other uses
 Wanting County, or Yuanqu County, a former county of imperial China 
 Wanting Town, or Wanding Town, in Yunnan Province, China

See also

Want (disambiguation)